Nankoweap Mesa is a 6,316-foot-elevation (1925 m) summit located in the eastern Grand Canyon, in Coconino County of northern Arizona, USA. It is situated adjacent to the East Rim, being the north major prominence along the Butte Fault. From south to north, and bordering the due-south flowing Colorado River (west bank), are Chuar Butte, Awatubi Crest, Kwagunt Butte, Malgosa Crest, and the Nankoweap Mesa. All the prominences are near the end of Marble Canyon, (down to the Little Colorado River confluence), Marble Canyon being the start of the Grand Canyon.

The North terminus of the mesa has a lower elevation prominence, (6,073 ft), and the center of the mesa contains a minor saddle point. One famous historical native tribes remains, is the Nankoweap Granaries, on the mesa's northeast flank, and overlooking the Colorado River.

Geology

The series of prominences from Chuar Butte northward are quite similar geologically. South of Chuar, volcanic extrusions have altered the region (Lava Creek, Lava Butte). The three prominences in the above photo can be seen sitting on the slopes of the red Supai Group members and the red cliffs of the Redwall Limestone. The slopes of the dull greenish Bright Angel Shale are the bases of the landforms.

See also
 Malgosa Crest
 Kwagunt Butte
 Geology of the Grand Canyon area

References

External links

Mesas of Arizona

Grand Canyon
Grand Canyon National Park

Landforms of Coconino County, Arizona
Mountains of Arizona
Mountains of Coconino County, Arizona
North American 1000 m summits